The Pomeroy Living History Farm is a 501(c)(3) non-profit farm museum on the National Register of Historic Places. Located in Yacolt, Washington, the site is an interactive recreation of a 1920s working farm, based on the original Pomeroy family's 1910 home and outlying structures and occupying 60 of the property's full .

Notes

References
 November 29, 1993 The Oregonian
July 2, 1997 The Oregonian
news and events from The Columbian newspaper

External links
pomeroyfarm.org

Farm museums in Washington (state)
Farms on the National Register of Historic Places in Washington (state)
Living museums in Washington (state)
Museums in Clark County, Washington
National Register of Historic Places in Clark County, Washington